Poyanar is a small village in Ratnagiri district, Maharashtra state in Western India. The 2011 Census of India recorded a total of 1,068 residents in the village.

Poyanar Kh. is a small village in the same region. The 2011 Census of India recorded a total of 109 residents in the village.

References

Villages in Ratnagiri district